Horace Charles Stoneham (April 27, 1903 – January 7, 1990) was an American Major League Baseball executive and the owner of the New York / San Francisco Giants from 1936 to 1976.

In  he moved the Giants from New York City to San Francisco, one of two National League owners to bring Major League Baseball to the west coast territory. Although the Giants won only one pennant and one division title in their first 15 years after moving to the Bay Area, they were a consistent contender that featured some of the era's biggest stars.

Stoneham was born in Newark, New Jersey, and educated, at the Hun School of Princeton and the Trinity-Pawling School. During his high school years, in 1919, his father bought the Giants. The younger Stoneham briefly attended Fordham University, but soon dropped out to work in a copper mine in California. At his father's insistence, he came back east to begin his apprenticeship as a baseball executive and future owner.  He worked on the Giants' grounds crew and in their ticket office, then moved into their front office.  When, at age 32, he succeeded to the team presidency on his father's death in January 1936, Stoneham became the youngest club owner in National League history.

Hands-on owner
His tenure witnessed three separate pennant-contending and -winning eras: the team that he inherited, the 1936–1938 Giants of Bill Terry, Carl Hubbell and Mel Ott; the 1949–1955 teams of manager Leo Durocher, including Monte Irvin, Sal Maglie, Bobby Thomson and Willie Mays; and the star-studded Giants of 1959–1971.  During Stoneham's 41 years as owner, the Giants won National League pennants in 1936, 1937, 1951, 1954 and 1962, a division title in 1971, and a World Series title in 1954.

Stoneham employed at least two general managers during those four decades: Bill Terry (1938–1942), who doubled as the Giants' field manager through 1941, and Chub Feeney (1946–1969), Stoneham's nephew, who became president of the National League (1970–1986) after his December 1969 resignation. Stoneham was known as a hands-on owner that was concerned with the day-to-day business of the Giants and personally involved in player trades and transactions.

With the post-World War II Giants falling into in the league's second division, Stoneham moved to replace the popular Ott as manager with Durocher on July 16, 1948. Giant fans initially reviled Durocher as the pilot of the arch-rival Brooklyn Dodgers, but he quickly produced an exciting team that just two years later, in 1951, won one of the most thrilling pennant races in history.  Durocher and Mays' 1954 Giants also took the NL flag and won Stoneham's only World Series title with a four-game sweep over the Cleveland Indians. That season, Stoneham was hailed as [[The Sporting News Executive of the Year Award|The Sporting News''' Executive of the Year]] in baseball.

Controversial move to San Francisco
As it turned out, the 1954 World Series title was the last hurrah for Stoneham and the Giants in New York.  Stoneham was alarmed by a dramatic drop-off in attendance during the 1950s. The 1947 Giants had drawn 1.6 million paying fans despite finishing fourth. But the 1951 pennant winners and 1954 world champions struggled to hit seven figures in home attendance, and mediocre 1956–57 Giants' teams had drawn fewer than 700,000 customers each season.  It did not help matters that the Giants' park, the Polo Grounds, was not aging gracefully. The park had been built in its present form in 1911 and had not been well maintained from the 1940s onward.  Meanwhile, the park's surrounding neighbourhoods (in Washington Heights in Upper Manhattan) had entered a steep economic and social decline, with rising rates of crime. All of these factors contributed to a sharp drop in attendance.

The Giants' dwindling gates hit Stoneham particularly hard. Unlike most of his fellow owners, the Giants and the Polo Grounds were his sole source of income.  Stoneham's balance sheet took a further hit after the 1955 season when the football Giants, who had spent their entire history as tenants of the baseball Giants, moved across the Harlem River to Yankee Stadium. Ironically, the baseball Giants' shrinking bottom line made it difficult for Stoneham to find the money needed for renovations even after laying off his maintenance staff. Even without that to consider, while the Giants owned the Polo Grounds, the land on which it stood was still owned by the heirs of James J. Coogan.

In hopes of finding a way out, Stoneham briefly considered moving to the Bronx as tenants of the Yankees—possibly before his lease at the Polo Grounds ran out in 1962.  Ironically, the Yanks had been tenants of the Giants at the Polo Grounds from 1913 to 1922.  However, impressed by the success of the Braves after their 1953 shift from Boston to Milwaukee, Stoneham decided to move his Giants to the Twin Cities of Minnesota.  He intended to set up shop in Metropolitan Stadium, which had just been constructed in Bloomington, halfway between Minneapolis and St. Paul, for his Triple-A farm team, the Minneapolis Millers.  The stadium had been built to major league specifications with the help of public funds, and Stoneham had declared there were at most two big-league parks that were better.  Under baseball rules of the time, the Giants shared the MLB rights to the Twin Cities with the Dodgers, who operated the Millers' main rival, the St. Paul Saints, as one of their three Triple-A affiliates.

Stoneham confided his plan to Dodgers owner Walter O'Malley, who then revealed that he was negotiating to transfer the Dodgers from Brooklyn to Los Angeles. He suggested that Stoneham contact San Francisco Mayor George Christopher and explore moving his team there to preserve the teams' bitter rivalry. Stoneham soon abandoned his Minnesota plan and shifted his attention, permanently, to San Francisco. In 1961, the Twin Cities succeeded in getting their own big-league team when the 1901–60 incarnation of the Washington Senators moved there and became the Minnesota Twins.

Stoneham and O'Malley were vilified by New York baseball fans when their teams' boards approved the moves to the West Coast. Stoneham was confronted by fans both angry—they chanted, after their last home game on September 29: "We want Stoneham! With a rope around his neck!"—and grief-stricken. During the August 19, 1957 press conference officially announcing the franchise's move to San Francisco, he explained, "Kids are still interested, but you don't see many of their parents at games." (In his book Five Seasons, Roger Angell quotes Stoneham as saying, "The last day we played [at the Polo Grounds], I couldn't go to the game. I just didn't want to see it all end.")

Writer Roger Kahn said years later, during promotional tours for his book The Era 1947–57'', that the deteriorating condition of the Polo Grounds, as well as the Giants' shrinking fan base, made it necessary for Stoneham to abandon New York. He noted, however, that the Dodgers—a year removed from the 1956 pennant and two from Brooklyn's first world championship—were still profitable and O'Malley's move West was motivated by a desire for even greater riches.

The Giants' transfer to San Francisco was initially a rousing success.  The team began to play winning baseball and drew 1.27 and 1.42 million fans playing in a tiny (22,900 capacity) minor league ballpark, Seals Stadium, in 1958–59.  Then the Giants moved to brand-new Candlestick Park in 1960 and attendance rose above 1.75 million fans.  (Meanwhile, the National League returned to New York in 1962, with an expansion team, the Mets.)

Talented team produced one pennant
While Stoneham's San Francisco club produced only one pennant (in ), one National League West Division title, and no World Series triumphs, the Giants of the late 1950s and 1960s were one of the most talented assemblages in the National League. They included five Hall of Famers—Willie Mays, Willie McCovey, Juan Marichal, Orlando Cepeda and Gaylord Perry—and many other stars. The Giants were the first big league team to heavily scout and sign players from the Dominican Republic and brought the first Japanese player, pitcher Masanori Murakami, to the Majors in 1964.

But the National League was so powerful and competitive—it had far outpaced the American League in signing African-American and Latin American players—the Giants had only one pennant to show for a decade-plus of contention. In , the team won 101 games and forced another best-of-three playoff with the Dodgers, then prevailed in the final inning of the decisive third game.  In another echo of 1951, they were defeated by the Yankees in the World Series.

Stoneham was partially to blame for the Giants' lack of sustained dominance, as he squandered the resources of his productive farm system through a series of poorly advised trades, usually for starting pitchers who could complement Marichal and Perry.  He also hired as his manager from 1961–64 Alvin Dark, who had a brilliant baseball mind but a poor relationship with at least some of his minority players. Dark was fired after the 1964 Giants fell just short in a wild, end-of-season pennant race; almost as notably, his dismissal came after he had made well-publicized and derogatory remarks to the press about Latin ballplayers during the season. (Dark later said he was misquoted.)  Long-time Durocher aide Herman Franks, Dark's successor, then produced four consecutive second-place finishes through 1968.

In , Mays' final full season with San Francisco, the Giants roared to an early lead in the NL West, winning 37 of their first 51 games to build a -game margin over the Dodgers through May 31. Then they fell to earth, going only 53–58 for the rest of the season. Still, they prevailed by a single game over Los Angeles to become division champions.  In the 1971 National League Championship Series, however, the eventual world champion Pittsburgh Pirates handled Stoneham's club in four games.

In 1959, Stoneham began developing a spring training facility for the San Francisco Giants at Francisco Grande, in Casa Grande, Arizona. Francisco Grande hosted its first exhibition game in 1961, where Willie Mays hit a 375-foot home run in the fourth inning.  Francisco Grande, now a hotel and golf resort, still houses various memorabilia of the San Francisco Giants of the 1960s.

Struggles during the 1970s
After their initial success, Stoneham's Giants fell on hard times after 1971. The arrival of the cross-bay Oakland Athletics in 1968 split the market.  The Athletics themselves struggled at the turnstiles, leading to doubts about whether the Bay Area was big enough for two MLB teams. Attendance at cold and windy Candlestick Park plummeted after 1971 to levels even below those at the Polo Grounds in the mid-1950s; during Stoneham's final five years as owner, only in  did the Giants draw more than 648,000 fans, causing Stoneham financial hardship.  This was the same situation that forced him to move to San Francisco almost 20 years earlier.

Finally, in 1976, he put the team up for sale. The Giants very nearly moved back east, to Toronto, when a deal with Canadian investors seemed imminent. In addition, it was briefly rumoured that they might return to the metropolitan New York area, perhaps to a new baseball stadium in the New Jersey Meadowlands. Instead, Stoneham sold it to San Francisco real estate magnate Bob Lurie and Phoenix, Arizona-based meat-packer Bud Herseth for $8 million, with the transaction unanimously approved by the other National League club owners on March 2, 1976. The deal represented a handsome return on his father's purchase of the team for $1 million 57 years earlier. 

Stoneham died at age 86 in Scottsdale, Arizona.

References

1903 births
1990 deaths
Major League Baseball executives
Major League Baseball owners
New York Giants (NL) executives
New York Giants (NL) owners
San Francisco Giants executives
San Francisco Giants owners